Monrad Oskar Norderval (1902–1976) was a Norwegian bishop in the Church of Norway.

Norderval was born in Ålesund, Norway in 1902.  He graduated with the cand.theol. degree in 1928 from the Royal Frederick University in Oslo. He began his ministry as an assistant pastor in Skjervøy in 1929.  He then served as vicar in Tana from 1929–1935, in Ørsta from 1935–1948, Ålesund from 1948–1961, and was the bishop of the Diocese of Nord-Hålogaland from 1961–1972.  He also published poems, essay collections, and memoirs.  He died in Ålesund in 1976.

He was one of the founders of the human rights organization Mission Behind the Iron Curtain, a precursor to Stefanus Alliance International.

References

1902 births
1976 deaths
People from Ålesund
Bishops of Hålogaland
20th-century Lutheran bishops